Cat food is food specifically designed for consumption by cats. As obligate carnivores, cats have specific requirements for their dietary nutrients, namely nutrients found only in meat, such as taurine, arginine, and Vitamin B6. Certain nutrients, including many vitamins and amino acids, are degraded by the temperatures, pressures and chemical treatments used during manufacture, and hence must be added after manufacture to avoid nutritional deficiency.

History
During the 19th century and early 20th centuries, meat for cats and dogs in London, frequently horse meat, was sold from barrows (hand–carts) by traders known as Cat's Meat Men or Women. Henry Mayhew estimated in London Labour and the London Poor (1851) that the total number of cats in London might be 300,000. Each cat's meat seller had a particular route and served a few hundred households, their approach marked by mewing cats.

The idea of preparing specialized food for cats came later than dog food and dog biscuits. This was likely due to the idea that cats could readily fend for themselves. In 1837, a French writer Mauny de Mornay critiqued this idea:

In 1844, another French writer, Nicolas Jean-Baptiste Boyard, expanded on this idea:

He goes on to say that it is all the more unreasonable to expect a cat to live from hunting in that cats take mice more for amusement than to eat: "A good cat takes many and eats few."

By 1876, Gordon Stables emphasized the need to give cats particular food:

In the same year, an advertisement for Spratt (better known for making dog food) said that their cat food entirely superseded "the unwholesome practice of feeding on boiled horse flesh". And, in another book on cats, Stables recommended the company's food:

Spratt, which began by making dog biscuits, appears to also have been the first commercial producer of cat food.

Natural diet

Cats are obligate carnivores—meaning, they are true carnivores and depend upon the nutrients present in animal flesh for their dietary needs. Even domesticated cats will relish freshly killed meat from rodents, rabbits, amphibians, birds, reptiles and fish, whether through hunting or by having it provided by humans, but cats are also opportunistic feeders and will readily take cooked food as well as dried cat food when offered, if that food is palatable. The natural diet of cats therefore does not include any vegetable matter, although cats have been known to eat certain plants and grasses occasionally, usually as an emetic.

Cats cannot synthesize some essential nutrients required for survival, including the amino acids taurine and arginine, so these nutrients must be sourced from fresh meat in the natural diet. Cats lack the specific physiology to extract nutrients efficiently from plant-based materials, and require a high protein diet, which is why high-energy meats from freshly killed prey are optimal foods.

Packaging and labeling

In the United States, cat foods labeled as "complete and balanced" must meet standards established by the Association of American Feed Control Officials (AAFCO) either by meeting a nutrient profile or by passing a feeding trial. Cat Food Nutrient Profiles were established in 1992 and updated in 2014 by the AAFCO's Feline Nutrition Expert Subcommittee. The updated profiles replaced the previous recommendations set by the National Research Council (NRC). Certain manufacturers label their products with terms such as premium, ultra premium, natural and holistic. Such terms currently have no legal definitions. However, "While most of the food supplied comes from within the US, the FDA ensures that standards are met within our borders even when components come from countries with less stringent levels of safety or label integrity."

Gastrointestinal health
The gastrointestinal tract (GIT) is the source of nutrient absorption, making it integral to overall health. Research shows fiber, prebiotics, probiotics, antioxidants and fatty acids are important in maintaining gastrointestinal health.

To achieve optimal cellular health (especially in the gut) and to maintain a healthy microbiome, proper nutrition is necessary (nutrition is multifactorial and complex). 
Cats with gastrointestinal diseases must consume an easily digestible diet with the appropriate nutrients provided by easily digestible ingredients and in the correct ratio which is recommended to be fed in small portions frequently throughout the day, so as not to overwhelm the digestive system. 
It is also important for fat to be digestible because too much undigested fat that reaches the end of the digestive tract (colon) has the possibility of being fermented and can worsen the symptoms of GIT disease and induce other reactions like diarrhea. 
It has also been suggested that cats should eat diets tailored to the section of the GIT that is diseased.

When certain nutrients like fructooligosaccharides (FOS) are included in the diet, the microbiome and fatty acid content are often changed for the better. An example is less branched-chain fatty acids (BCFAs; which are more difficult and take more time to digest) are produced and more short-chain fatty acids (SCFAs; which are easier to digest and are more readily available sources of energy which can be used for supporting cell turnover keeping cells, like those found in the GIT, thereby improving GIT health and immune function) are produced.
FOS can also impact production of other fatty acids.

Malnutrition
Malnutrition can be a problem for cats fed non-conventional diets. Cats fed exclusively on raw, freshwater fish can develop a thiamine deficiency. Those fed exclusively on liver may develop vitamin A toxicity. Also, exclusively meat-based diets may contain excessive protein and phosphorus whilst being deficient in calcium, vitamin E, and microminerals such as copper, zinc, and potassium. Energy density must also be maintained relative to the other nutrients. When vegetable oil is used to maintain the energy balance cats may not find the food as palatable.

Commercial foods
Most store-bought cat food comes in either dry form, also known in the US as kibble, or wet form (canned or in pouches). Some manufacturers sell frozen raw diets and premix products to cater to owners who feed raw.

Dry

Dry food (8–10% moisture) is generally made by extrusion cooking under high heat and pressure. Approximately 95% of dry pet foods are extruded. During the extrusion cooking process, the meat is first ground up then it is cooked under very high heat and processed so it becomes a powder. The powder is fed into a massive mixer. Once it's in this massive mixer, additional supplements are added; then it's then cooked again under a very high heat to turn it into a dough. The dough is formed so that it can be molded into the form of kibble. The kibble is placed again in high heat to be baked in order to make it stay in that shape. Once the piece comes out, it doesn't smell like meat. Fat may be sprayed on the food after the extrusion cooking process to increase palatability, and other minor ingredients, such as heat-sensitive vitamins, which would be destroyed in the extrusion process, may be added. Dry food is most often packed in multi-wall paper bags, sometimes with a plastic film layer; similar bag styles with film laminates or coextrusions are also used.

Dry foods contain high amounts of carbohydrates in order to maintain their shape and structure. Concerns have been raised that there is some association between the carbohydrate content and risk of obesity and type 2 diabetes in felines.

Wet

In much of Europe, the UK and the US, canned or wet food (75–78% moisture) generally comes in aluminum or steel cans in  sizes. It is also sold in foil pouch form.

Renal diet

A renal diet is formulated for cats that are living with chronic kidney disease, or CKD. This is a highly prevalent condition in the feline population and is most common in the aging and older domesticated feline. It has been shown that the lifespan of cats experiencing CKD can be extended by as much as 2 years when receiving therapeutic diets rather than regular maintenance diets. These diets are low in protein, low in phosphorus, have a high energy density, a higher fat content and include omega-3 fatty acids.

Renal diets with low protein have been adopted by a number of big pet food manufacturers. Although the diet of a healthy cat should be high in protein, at times it is medically necessary for a cat to eat a low protein diet. For cats living with chronic renal disease, low protein diets lower the amount of nitrogenous waste in the body, helping to decrease the strain put on the kidneys. The exact level of protein that is needed for therapeutic CKD diets is unclear.

Low protein diets can be formulated as a wet or dry food, with the main difference being the moisture content. Unfortunately, low protein diets are not as palatable to cats as diets high in protein.

Low protein diets should not be fed to cats with the liver condition known as hepatic encephalopathy because severe protein restriction can be detrimental to animals with this condition. Cats with this condition should be fed a diet with high quality protein sources that have adequate amounts of the amino acids taurine and arginine.

In low protein diets, unless the protein source is a high quality protein such as an animal-based protein, cats (and especially kittens) have been shown to develop retinal degeneration due to a deficiency in taurine, an essential amino acid for cats that is derived from animal protein.

Low protein diets have been linked to health defects such as lack of growth, decreased food intake, muscle atrophy, hypoalbuminemia, skin alterations, and more. Cats on lower protein diets are more likely to lose weight, and to lose lean body mass.

Low protein diets that are high in carbohydrates have been found to decrease glucose tolerance in cats. With a decreased glucose tolerance, clinical observations have confirmed that cats consuming large proportions of metabolizable energy, in the form of carbohydrates rather than protein, are more likely to develop hyperglycemia, hyperinsulinemia, insulin resistance, and obesity.

Restricting phosphorus has been proven to decrease the progression of CKD. This is because phosphorus can be deposited into soft tissues and become mineralized, which can cause kidney damage.

Formulating these diets with higher amounts of fat is important to make sure the food is palatable in the absence of protein and promote an increased caloric intake. The higher fat content will also spare the use of protein for energy and help decrease stress on the kidneys. Omega-3 fatty acids are included in therapeutic diets because of their anti-inflammatory properties to aid the diseased kidneys.

High energy
A high energy diet is generally high in fat. Compared to carbohydrates and protein, fat provides much more energy, at 8.5 kcal/g. High energy diets generally have a fat content greater than 20% on a dry matter basis. A high energy diet is appropriate for cats who are undergoing growth, recovering from illness, are pregnant or lactating, as their energy requirements are higher than otherwise. A lactating or gestating cat requires a nutrient-dense and highly digestible diet to withstand the high levels of stress being placed on her body. These conditions are found in cat food that is formulated for growth, performance, or high energy during all life stages.

To maintain a neutral energy balance and thus maintain body weight, energy intake should increase with energy expenditure. Studies that relate the number of meals offered to cats per day to their daily activity levels have shown conflicting results. It has been shown that cats offered four meals a day or a random number of meals a day have similar energy levels, greater than those fed only one meal per day. It has been postulated that this increased energy level could be due to purported spikes in activity before being fed, known as food anticipatory activity. Other studies on female cats have found that increasing the daily amount of food may actually decrease their daily activity levels. The age, sex, and whether cats are intact or have been spayed/neutered are all factors controlling activity level.

As cats age, there is evidence that their metabolic energy requirements may increase, especially after 12 or 13 years old, but other evidence suggests that metabolic energy needs are not dissimilar at different ages. Furthermore, it has been shown that cats over 12 years old are more likely to be underweight than younger cats, so a high calorie diet may be appropriate to treat weight loss, and thus to maintain an appropriate body condition score. Weight loss can occur when the cat expends more energy but does not increase its food energy intake. It has also been demonstrated that as cats age, they are less able to digest and thus absorb dietary fats and proteins.

Pregnancy and lactation are strenuous periods on the female cat. During pregnancy a cat should gain 38% of their body weight by the time they are ready to give birth. It is recommended that a cat's diet should contain 4000 kcal per kg of dry food while pregnant; during lactation it is recommended that the cat consumes 240 - 354 kcal ME per kg of body weight. Studies show that increasing the intake of food for a pregnant animal in order to help it gain weight can have negative effects. It is acknowledged that rather than increasing intake, feeding a highly energy dense food is a way to ensure that the female cat, or queen, receives adequate energy and nutrient requirements are met.

It has been found that nutritional support consistent with the resting energy requirement (RER) soon after surgery or the onset of illness decreases the mortality rate and the duration of hospitalization in cats. A recovering cat needs enough energy (calories), as well as more protein and fats. Critical care diets are formulated to be highly palatable and digestible, as well as high energy density. This limits the mass of food required to be consumed to meet the RER. This type of high energy diet has proven to be very important in the nutritional support of post-operative and ill cats.

Raw food
Raw feeding is providing uncooked ingredients to cats. Most of the diet will consist of animal-based ingredients, though fruits, vegetables and supplements are often added. Commercial raw food is mainly sold in three formats: fresh, frozen and freeze-dried. Thawing and rehydration are necessary before feeding frozen and freeze-dried food respectively. Many available commercial diets are AAFCO certified in meeting the nutrient requirements of the cat. Some diets may be formulated for all life stages or they can also be AAFCO certified for adult maintenance or growth and gestation/lactation. Many people feed their cats raw food believing that it mimics the prey diet that wild cats would consume. Firm believers report that such a diet can bring about many health benefits, such as a shinier coat, cleaner teeth and an improved immunity to various gastrointestinal ailments (with diarrhoea and constipation being the most common), as well as an increase in energy and a decrease in bodily waste odours, although no scientific evidence exists to prove these claims.

Commercial raw diets can undergo High Pressure Pasteurization (HPP), a process which kills bacteria and pathogens, including salmonella, using high water pressure. This technique is USDA approved and allows raw food to remain uncooked while greatly improving its safety and shelf-life. However, every year, many commercial raw pet foods are recalled due to various bacterial contamination, implying that feeding raw comes with a risk.

Weight control

Weight control simply means ensuring an energy balance: energy in equals energy out. Weight gain means more energy is being consumed than is being expended in exercise and other functions. A weight management diet is designed to allow fewer calories to be consumed in a larger volume of food, allowing for less risk of an energy imbalance.

Adult cats should be fed a diet that promotes maintaining a healthy weight, while at the same time meeting the individual taste preference of the cat. Cats generally prefer to eat smaller meals more frequently, which can lead to less weight gain compared to cats that are fed free-choice (always available) food. Meanwhile, some cats adapt to free-choice feeding and can maintain normal body weight with no weight gain. In general, indoor cats have less opportunity or need for exercise than outdoor cats; indoor cats are much more prone to weight gain. For indoor cats, there are a variety of choices to promote exercise, including various cat toys designed to stimulate chase and play behaviours. Overall, if an adult cat cannot maintain normal body condition on a free-choice feeding diet, despite exercise levels, portion-controlled feeding is recommended. Many pet cats are fed energy-dense, high carbohydrate diets, which provide much more energy than needed. This is a major issue with indoor cats as it has been shown to lead to obesity. To prevent cats from becoming overweight, owners should be more inclined to implement weight control diets, which provide the cat with nutrient-dense, low energy ingredients. Studies show that cats fed lower energy diets have significantly reduced incidences of obesity, as the typical indoor pet cat does not need more energy than their resting energy requirement. For an average cat weighing 10-11 pounds (about 5 kg), it would have a resting energy requirement of 180-200 kcal/day.

Along with energy input and output, specific nutrients can be important in weight control diets. Fiber is an important component that helps control weight, along with various other benefits. A source of soluble and fermentable fiber helps to increase the movement of digesta through the gut and decrease gastric emptying. This helps to increase satiety in cats, potentially decreasing feeding rates and voluntary energy consumption. Fermentable fiber promotes healthy mucosa and commensal bacterial growth and improved digestion/nutrient absorption. Prebiotic fibers like fructooligosaccharides (FOS) and mannooligosaccharides (MOS) decrease the number of pathogenic bacteria and increase the number of beneficial bacteria in the gut. They also help to maintain microbial balance and a healthy immune system. Fiber is fermented in the colon to produce short-chain fatty acids which can be used as an energy source. Fermentable fiber has been demonstrated to enhance general health and decrease inflammation. Furthermore, non-fermentable fiber is critical to the formation of well-formed stool, and has been known to increase diet bulk while decreasing caloric density. Insoluble fiber has been proposed to regulate appetite by releasing hormones that reduce hunger. Sources of fiber commonly added in weight management cat food include beet pulp, barley, psyllium and cellulose.

Another nutrient important for weight control diets is protein and its component amino acids. Felines, being obligate carnivores, require a natural diet of animal products which consists of protein and fat (i.e. muscle, organs and animal tissue). Dietary protein supplies amino acids that can be utilized and metabolised as energy before using fat stores,  even though protein is not stored in the body the same way as fat. Dietary fat is more efficiently converted to body fat than protein; if an animal is consuming more than its energy requirement and if the excess energy is provided by fat, more weight will be gained than if the excess calories are coming from protein. Dietary protein also improves satiety during feed, resulting in decreased overconsumption of food. The protein content of the diet is a key factor in building and maintaining lean body (muscle) mass, which is an important aspect of weight control. Lean body mass maintenance is regulated by protein intake, but more importantly is regulated by exercise. Limited protein and amino acids in the diet will limit lean body mass growth, but exercise or lack of exercise will allow growth or shrinking of muscle. Successful weight control involves maintenance of healthy adipose tissue levels, but most importantly maintenance of lean body mass. Lean muscle is the driver of basal energy metabolism and aids in the use of energy. When sufficient levels of fat are provided, fat will be used by the body as an energy source, but only when there are insufficient levels of protein.

An important component of many weight loss/weight control diets is L-carnitine. This is a vitamin-like substance that is found in animal protein. It can be found in ingredients commonly used in more commercial pet foods, but specifically weight management/weight loss diets. L-carnitine is involved in many biological pathways, more specifically fatty acid metabolism, allowing for the conversion of long-chain fatty acids into energy. The introduction of L-carnitine ensures rapid transport and oxidation of fatty acids as well as efficient usage of dietary fatty acids and protein. Supplementary L-carnitine is used more often in weight loss diets, since its benefits mainly involve fatty acid metabolism to control weight loss. However, since weight control is, in essence, a prevention stage in overall weight management, it still has value in weight control diets in preserving and building lean body mass and inhibiting the storage of excess dietary fat. The majority of studies focusing on supplementary L-carnitine use look at its benefits for weight loss, including its effect on metabolic rate and fatty acid oxidation. At the same time, these studies still show similar results that prove their effects of controlling fatty acid metabolism for weight control, to avoid the need for weight loss diets.

Grain-free
Grain free cat food substitutes the typical carbohydrate sources like wheat, corn or rice with alternative sources such as white potato, peas, sweet potato or tapioca.

A study published in the Journal of Feline Medicine and Surgery in 2018 compared the carbohydrate content between grain-free diets and diets containing grains. According to this study the proportion of cat food purchased that is grain free has increased from 4% to 9% between 2012 and 2014. The researchers at Tufts University analyzed the nutritional information and contents of 77 different dry cat food diets. 42 of these diets contained grain, while 35 were labeled as grain free. The major ingredients and amounts were determined for each diet and then analyses were conducted comparing the two groups. It was found that the grain free diets had a lower mean carbohydrate content than the diets containing grain; however, there was a very wide range and lots of overlap between the two groups in both their carbohydrate contents. Some grain free diets even had a higher amount of carbohydrates than the diets containing grain. Calorie amounts were similar for both diets.

A recent study published by the FDA has potentially linked grain free diets to dilated cardiomyopathy in both dogs and cats. While the majority of cases reported were for canines, 14 cases were reported between 2014 and 2019 for cats.

Allergy to grains is very rare in cats. Corn in particular is less likely to cause allergy than meat, fish, and dairy. There is also no evidence of gluten causing ill effects in cats.

Vegetarian and vegan

Vegetarian or vegan cat food has been available for many years, and is targeted primarily at vegan and vegetarian pet owners. While a small percentage of owners choose such a diet based on its perceived health benefits, the majority do so due to ethical concerns, such as about the large environmental impacts of animal agriculture.  There is much controversy over feeding cats a vegetarian or vegan diet. A 2023 review indicates adequate vegan diets would not have adverse impacts on the health of pet cats.

As obligate carnivores, cats require nutrients (including arginine, taurine, arachidonic acid, vitamin A, vitamin B12 and niacin) found in meat sources. Plant sources typically do not contain enough of these. Vegetarian pet food companies try to correct these deficiencies by enriching their feed formulation with such nutrients. According to a study, cats have a higher protein digestibility than dogs which increases their ability to absorb protein as dietary protein intake gets shifted from animal to plant sources.

Special considerations
Cats on a vegan diet can develop abnormally alkaline (high pH) urine as plant-based proteins are more alkaline than the meat-based foods which cats have evolved to eat. When the urine becomes too alkaline (pH > 5.4), there is an increased risk of formation of struvite (also known as magnesium ammonium phosphate) bladder crystals and/or stones. Calcium oxalate stones can also occur if the urine is too acidic. Such stones can create irritation and infection of the urinary tract and require veterinary treatment.

Organizations that advocate vegan or vegetarian diets for people have split opinions regarding vegetarian or vegan cat food. The International Vegetarian Union, the Vegan Society and PETA are some of the organizations that support a vegan or vegetarian diet for cats. But the Vegetarian Society suggests people "consider carefully" and that many cats will not adjust to a vegetarian diet. The Animal Protection Institute also does not recommend a vegetarian diet for cats, and cautions that dietary deficiencies may take months or years to develop and may be untreatable. They do not recommend relying on supplements, because they may not contain necessary co-factors and enzymes and have not been studied for long term implications. The animal welfare organization American Society for the Prevention of Cruelty to Animals, although suggesting a supplemented vegetarian diet for dogs, recommends against vegetarian and vegan diets for cats. The Association of Veterinarians for Animal Rights (now Humane Society Veterinary Medical Association) accepts that a plant-based diet can be nutritionally adequate, but stated in August 2006 that such diets "cannot at this time be reliably assured". A review recommends a cautious approach to vegan cat food given "the lack of large population-based studies" as of 2023 and that commercial foods are used if guardians wish to implement a vegan diet.

Homemade

Many pet owners feed cats homemade diets.  These diets generally consist of some form of cooked or raw meat, bone, vegetables, and supplements, such as taurine and multivitamins. Homemade diets either follow a recipe, such as the BARF (bone and raw food) diet which provides a series of options for the pet owner to make, or rely on the constant rotation of ingredients to meet nutrient requirements.  A study was conducted that analyzed 95 homemade BARF diets and found that 60% of these were nutritionally imbalanced in either one or a combination of calcium, phosphorus, vitamin D, iodine, zinc, copper, or vitamin A content.

Another 2019 study on a range of homemade diet recipes found online and in books has also found nutritional inadequacies. The authors mention that vegetarianism and support for organics food are common reasons for trying such a diet, but does not specifically address the adequacy of vegetarian or organic diets.

Nutrients and supplements
Vitamin deficiencies can lead to wide-ranging clinical abnormalities that reflect the diversity of their metabolic roles. Twelve minerals are known to be essential nutrients for cats. Calcium and phosphorus are crucial to strong bones and teeth. Cats need other minerals, such as magnesium, potassium, and sodium, for nerve impulse transmission, muscle contraction, and cell signaling. Many minerals only present in minute amounts in the body, including selenium, copper, and molybdenum, act as helpers in a wide variety of enzymatic reactions.

The table below lists the AAFCO nutritional profiles for cat foods along with the roles of vitamins and minerals in cat nutrition according to the National Research Council.

Many nutrients can cause a variety of deficiency symptoms in cats, and the skin is a vital organ that is susceptible to dietary changes in minerals, protein, fatty acids, and vitamins A and B. Cats show dietary inadequacies in their skin through excess or inadequate oil production, and skin toughening. This results in dandruff, redness, hair loss, greasy skin, and reduced hair growth.

Arginine

Cats are unusually dependent on a constant supply of the amino acid arginine, and a diet lacking arginine causes marked weight loss and can be rapidly fatal. Arginine is an essential additive in cat food because cats have low levels of the enzymes which are responsible for the synthesis of ornithine and citrulline in the small intestine (specifically, for pyrroline-5-carboxylate production). Citrulline would typically go on to the kidneys to make arginine, but because cats have a deficiency in the enzymes that make it, citrulline is not produced in adequate quantities to make arginine. Arginine is essential in the urea cycle in order to convert the toxic component ammonia into urea that can then be excreted in the urine. Because of its essential role, deficiency in arginine results in a buildup of toxic ammonia and leads to hyperammonemia. The symptoms of hyperammonemia include lethargy, vomiting, ataxia, and hyperesthesia, and can be serious enough to induce death and coma in a matter of days if a cat is being fed an arginine-free diet. These symptoms appear quickly because diets devoid in arginine will typically still contain all of the other amino acids, which will continue to be catabolized by the body, producing mass amounts of ammonia that very quickly build up with no way of being excreted.

Zinc
Zinc's connection to skin and coat health is due to its influence on regulating cellular metabolism. Zinc also supports proper immune function and suitable activity within the inflammatory response. Deficiencies result in disorders of the skin and poor immune functioning. When zinc is supplemented in diets, skin scaliness decreases. Dietary sources include poultry, red meat, and eggs.

Copper
One of the many functions of copper is to assist in production of connective tissue and the pigment melanin. A deficiency in dietary copper is also related to collagen abnormalities, hypopigmentation of the skin, and alopecia. Sources for cats include liver and supplements in the forms of copper sulphate and cupric oxide.

Selenium
Selenium works with vitamin E as antioxidants to remove the free radicals that are damaging to the body and the skin. Selenium also plays a role with other antioxidants to help maintain cell membranes which provides further protection from free radicals causing oxidative stress. Oxidative stress plays a role in development of skin diseases.  Dietary sources of selenium are naturally occurring in selenomethionine and tuna.

Essential fatty acids
A fatty acid molecule consists of a (COOH) group attached to an aliphatic chain. There are many types of fatty acid with different such chains. These different types have somewhat different properties. Saturated fatty acids have no carbon=carbon double bonds, while polyunsaturated fatty acids have more than one such bond in each molecule. The main form of fatty acids in diet is fats or triglycerides, which consist of three fatty acid groups attached to a glycerin molecule.

Fatty acids can become attached to different molecules such as carbohydrates or proteins, and can implement a wide range of functions in the body. These functions include long-term energy storage, insulation (prevents heat loss, protects vital organs, helps transmit nerve impulses faster), structure, transportation around the body for nutrients and other biological molecules. They can also be precursors to other compounds in the body, such as hormones (some of which are important for gut/immune/overall health). The length, degree of saturation and configuration of a fatty acid affects how it is broken down, absorbed and used in the gastrointestinal tract. Essential fatty acids (EFA) are nutrients that cats are unable to produce in sufficient amounts to meet their needs, or at all. All EFAs are polyunsaturated. EFAs also vary in size, have many different functions and can also be further divided into other categories, two of which are very important for gastrointestinal health: the omega-6 and omega-3 fatty acids. (The omega number denotes the position of the first double bond in a fatty acid, counting from the methyl end.) These fatty acids are most effective when present in adequate and appropriate balanced ratios dependent upon stage of life and production of the animal. Omega-6 fatty acids at high levels can suppress the functions of the immune system (a large part of which is located in the gastrointestinal tract) and promote inflammation, platelet aggregation and hypersensitive reactions like allergies. Omega-3 fatty acids act in the opposite direction to omega-6 fatty acids, by reducing inflammation and depressing aggregation and immunosuppression. The diet provided will determine the ratio of omega-6 to omega-3 fatty acids consumed; the optimal ratio of omega-6 to omega-3 fatty acids is considered to be within the range of 5:1 to 10:1. The right ratio helps reduce inflammation and mediate immune responses, as both types of fatty acid use the same enzymes in their metabolic journey.

There are three essential fatty acids that should be included in a cat's diet: alpha-linolenic acid, linoleic acid, and arachidonic acid. Alpha-linolenic acid is an omega-3 fatty acid that aids in the maintenance of the skin's water barrier. Ingredients that are high in alpha-linolenic acid, such as flaxseed, should be included in the cat's diet. Another source of omega-3s is fish oil. Eicosapentaenoic acid (EPA) and Docosahexaenoic acid (DHA) are omega-3 fatty acids which have anti-inflammatory properties. Linoleic acid is an example of an omega-6 fatty acid that helps with the health of the cat's skin by maintaining the integrity of their epithelial tissues. Linoleic acid is commonly found in plant-based oils like sunflower oil. Arachidonic acid is also essential to cats because they are unable to create it from linoleic acid due to an absence of the Delta 6 desaturase enzyme. It can be found in substances such as animal fat.

Vitamin A
Vitamin A  is a crucial nutritional component in the maintenance of feline skin and coat health.  In addition to its many other functions, vitamin A plays an important role in the keratinization of the skin, hair and nails along with assisting in the development of various epithelial tissues throughout the body.  The cells making up the epithelial tissues of the skin, respiratory and gastrointestinal tracts rely on vitamin A to successfully complete the process of mitosis in order preserve these tissues and repair any damages.   The mucous secreting cells of the respiratory and gastrointestinal epithelium also specifically require vitamin A to successfully produce a specialized protein referred to as mucoproteins which aid in maintaining the health of these tissues.  Unlike most other mammals, the cat is unique in that they are unable to transform B-carotene to vitamin A and therefore explicitly require active forms of vitamin A which are only found in animal products.  This difference in metabolism is due to very low levels of activity of the enzyme B-carotene 15, 15' dioxygenase in feline species.  The nutrient profiles developed by AAFCO currently advise a minimum of 3332 IU/kg of vitamin A on a dry matter basis included in adult diets and 6668 IU/kg in the diets of raising kittens as well as pregnant or lactating female cats. Common ingredients which help to incorporate the proper levels of vitamin A into feline diets include various types of liver as well as fish oils.

B vitamins

Niacin (B3)
Niacin is an essential vitamin for the cat; dietary deficiency can lead to anorexia, weight loss and an increase in body temperature. Biosynthesis of niacin occurs by metabolism of tryptophan via the kynurenine pathway to quinolinic acid, the niacin precursor. However, cats have a high activity of picolinic acid carboxylase, which converts one of the intermediates to picolinic acid instead of quinolinic acid. As a result, niacin can become deficient and require supplementation.

Biotin (B7)
Biotin can be provided in feline diets by adding cooked eggs, liver, milk, legumes or nuts. Microorganisms living in the gastrointestinal tracts of cats are also able to synthesize and supply an alternative source of biotin if proper nutritional requirements are met. Its main function in metabolism is as a coenzyme for essential carboxylation reactions throughout the body; however it has also been shown to aid in the management of certain skin diseases in cats. Biotin is recommended by AAFCO to be included in feline diets at a minimum level of 0.07 mg/kg on a dry matter basis throughout all stages of development. It is required only when the cat is taking antimicrobials that kill gut bacteria.

Vitamin C

Vitamin C (ascorbic acid) is a water-soluble antioxidant and a free radical scavenger where it will donate an electron to compounds with unpaired elections or reactive but not radical compounds. Supplements of Vitamin C reduce oxidative DNA damage in cats prone to kidney injury, and can be beneficial to add into diets for cats with renal diseases. Vitamin C is not essential for cats and it is not required by the Association of American Feed Control Officials (AAFCO); however, it is commonly added into pet foods as an antioxidant. Ascorbic acid is known to function in gene expression as a co-substrate, and have unique biosynthetic pathways in different organisms.

Unlike humans, felines are able to synthesize Vitamin C in the liver, via the glucuronate pathway. The simple sugars glucose and galactose are used as input. This pathway naturally maintains ascorbic acid (active Vitamin C) at an adequate level; therefore it does not need to be separately included in their diet.

Vitamin D

Vitamin D is a dietary requirement for cats as they lack the ability to efficiently synthesize vitamin D3 using sunlight. This fat-soluble vitamin is required in cats for bone formation through the promotion of calcium retention, along with nerve and muscle control through absorption of calcium and phosphorus. Wild cats probably gather vitamin D from prey liver.

Unlike dogs and humans, cats metabolize vitamin D2 and vitamin D3 slightly differently. A dose of Vitamin D2 is approximately 70% as effective as the same amount of vitamin D3.

Vitamin E

Vitamin E as an antioxidant in gastrointestinal health cat food diets can have a positive effect of improving the animal's immune function and prevent against infections. Vitamin E is a free radical scavenger that functions as a chain-breaking antioxidant to prevent free radical damage of cell membranes. Vitamin E aids in protecting cells from highly reactive oxygen species within the lungs, muscles, skin, brain, tissues and red blood cells. Supplementation of vitamin E in the diet benefits the immune system and improves resistance to infections and diseases.

The National Research Council (NRC) suggested a ratio of vitamin E to polyunsaturated fatty acids be 0.6:1 to ensure enough vitamin E to combat any free radicals. Polyunsaturated fatty acids (PUFA) are prone to oxidative destruction in cellular membranes and increase the requirement for antioxidants.

Vitamin E is an essential nutrient which needs to be included in the feline diet in order to protect the lipid components within cellular membranes of various tissues in the body. Vitamin E is able to accomplish this through working with selenium and acting as an antioxidant to prevent free radicals from interacting with these fatty acid membrane components, resulting in reduced levels of oxidative stress. This is particularly important in the skin as various oxidative environmental components can have very damaging effects if not protected by vitamin E. The nutrient profiles developed by AAFCO currently advise a minimum dry matter inclusion of 40 IU/kg of vitamin E in the diet of cats throughout all stages of development. Lipid metabolism is also a major contributor of free radicals, leading to an increased dietary requirement of vitamin E as the levels of polyunsaturated fatty acids in the diet increase. Ingredients such as wheat germ as well as certain plant oils contain high levels of active vitamin E and are commonly added to feline diets which are carefully stored in order to prevent oxidative destruction of vitamin E prior to consumption.

Fiber
The addition of fiber at optimal levels in a diet is essential for the normal function and health of the gastrointestinal tract. Cats are to occasionally consume plant material, mainly leaves, in response to a diet deficient in fiber.

Dietary fibers are plant carbohydrates which cannot be digested by mammalian enzymes. These structural plant carbohydrates include pectin, lignin, cellulose, hemicellulose, muclinage, and gums. Different types of fibers have varying levels of solubility and fermentation; this ranges from pectin which is highly fermentable, to beet pulp which is moderately fermentable, to cellulose which is non-fermentable. Non-fermentable fibers helps with satiety, maintenance of a normal intestinal transit time and gastrointestinal motility as well as increasing diet bulk. Fermentable fibers, on the other hand, are fermented to short-chain fatty acids by bacteria in the colon and have variable effects on gastric emptying. Moderately soluble fibers have been linked to increased colon weight as well as an increased mucosal surface area for absorption of nutrients.

Fiber, though it is not an essential nutrient, is important for a healthy gastrointestinal tract. The microbes found in the cat's large intestine have the ability to ferment dietary fibers to short-chain fatty acids. Cells of the gastrointestinal tract are constantly dying and being replaced by new cells, which requires a lot of energy. The fatty acids produced are used as energy sources for these epithelial cells which line the gastrointestinal tract. As a result of the presence of energy from the fatty acids, colonic cell proliferation is increases.

Short-chain fatty acids production from dietary fibers have many other advantageous effects on the gastrointestinal tract. They increase motility by stimulating rhythmic contractions of the distal portion of the small intestine, which potentially decreases fermentation in the small intestine while increasing it in the large intestine for further fatty acid absorption. Blood flow to the colon also increases with the presence of short-chain fatty acids. These fatty acids also increase sodium absorption which helps maintain normal electrolyte and fluid balance in the intestine, reducing the risk for diarrhea . These homeostatic conditions of the intestinal tract promote the growth of beneficial bacteria while inhibiting the proliferation of pathogenic ones. A healthy and balanced gut microbiome is important for maintaining a healthy digestive tract.

Fibers promote bacterial growth and activity in the large intestine. It is essential for a healthy gastrointestinal tract to have a healthy and stable gut microbiota. The microorganisms present in the colon are responsible for the fermentation of the fiber into short-chain fatty acids and for the production of some vitamins.

Prebiotics
Prebiotics are short-chain carbohydrates classified as fibers with an added aspect as they selectively promote the growth of beneficial bacteria. By promoting the health and proliferation of beneficial bacteria, they suppress the growth of pathogenic ones by outcompeting them. inulin, galactooligosaccharides, lactulose, fructooligosaccharides (FOS) and mannanoligosaccharides (MOS) are all examples of prebiotics.

Probiotics
Probiotics (live microbes) are becoming increasingly popular in the diets of felines. They are included in the diet to increase the number of bacteria and microbes that are normally present in a healthy gut. Probiotics are considered a supplement rather than part of nutrition. Therefore, there are no strict regulations to the amount of probiotics that should be included in foods.

The function of probiotics goes beyond basic nutrition and has many benefits to the health of the organism. The use of probiotics can help in the prevention and treatment of certain diseases or disorders of felines. Examples include prevention of allergies, diarrhea, symptoms relating to stress, etc. The health of the cats is very much dependent on the fermentation that occurs through gut biota. The gut biota has an important role in the metabolism, absorption, and protective functions of the gastro intestinal tract. Felines have different gut bacteria than canines. However, the most common biota that are found in both felines and canines are Bacillota, Bacteroidota, Pseudomonadota, and Fusobacteriota. Although these are the most common types of gut biota found in felines, there are variances between independent cats. Each cat has their own unique and independent number and type of gut microbes.

Antioxidants

Nutraceuticals such as antioxidants are considered to be additives of gastrointestinal diets to prevent digestive upset. Antioxidants have the ability to remove free radicals from the body which can cause damage to cell membranes, and are involved in chronic degenerative diseases. Free radicals amplify inflammation by causing release of pro-inflammatory cytokines. Free radicals can be caused by many factors such as stress, disease and age. Some oxygen-derived free radicals can produce ischemia in the small bowel and stomach of cats. Combinations of antioxidants have been reported to improve serum vitamin status, suppress lipid peroxidation and distributes the effects of exercise on the immune system. The most common antioxidants found in cat gastrointestinal diets are vitamin E and vitamin C.

Taurine
Cats have a sulfinoalanine decarboxylase deficiency, preventing the synthesis of taurine from cysteine.

Food allergy

Food allergy is a non-seasonal disease with skin and/or gastrointestinal disorders. The main complaint is excessive scratching (pruritus) which is usually resistant to treatment by steroidal anti-inflammatory drugs. The exact prevalence of food allergy in cats remains unknown. In 20 to 30% of the cases, cats have concurrent allergic diseases (atopy/flea-allergic dermatitis). A reliable diagnosis can only be made with dietary elimination-challenge trials. Allergy testing is necessary for the identification of the causative food component(s). Therapy consists of avoiding the offending food component(s).

Recalls and contaminants

The broad pet food recalls starting in March 2007 came in response to reports of renal failure in pets consuming mostly wet pet foods made with wheat gluten from a single Chinese company beginning in February 2007. Overall, several major companies recalled more than 100 brands of pet foods with most of the recalled product coming from Menu Foods. The most likely cause according to the FDA is the presence of melamine in the wheat gluten of the affected foods. Melamine is known to falsely inflate the protein content rating of substances in laboratory tests. The economic impact on the pet food market was extensive, with Menu Foods alone losing roughly $30 million from the recall. Some companies were not affected and utilized the situation to generate sales for alternative pet foods.

Bisphenol A
A 2004 study reported that food packaged in cans coated with bisphenol A is correlated with the development of hyperthyroidism in cats.

Environmental impact

In a study on the impacts of the pet food industry on world fish and seafood supplies, researchers estimate that 2.48 million metric tonnes of fish are used by the cat food industry each year. It was suggested that there needs to be "a more objective and pragmatic approach to the use of a limited and decreasing biological resource, for human benefit." Marine conservation activist Paul Watson argues that the reduction in forage fish such as those commonly used in cat food (sardines, herring, anchovy etc.) negatively affects fish higher up the food chain like cod, tuna and swordfish, not to mention marine mammals and birds.

Based on 2004 numbers, cats in the US consume the caloric equivalent of what 192,000 (0.0655%) Americans consume. While pet food is made predominantly using byproducts from human food production, the increase in popularity of human-grade and byproduct-free pet food means there is increasing pressure on the overall meat supply.

AAFCO recommends 26% crude protein for feline diets on a dry matter basis. High animal protein in cat food has increased in popularity due to consumer demand for natural diets, in which protein content is usually much higher than the AAFCO minimum levels. This trend has led to a higher need for animal protein, which may have a detrimental effect on sustainability.

In 2015, there were an estimated 77.8 million dogs and 85.6 million cats in the USA. The consumer desire to feed their pets premium foods which advertise healthy and human-grade ingredients, coupled with more pet ownership, requires more meat; this could require more land for raising livestock. In a study conducted by Okin in 2017, he suggests that if a quarter of all animal protein used in the food of American pets was human-grade, it would be equivalent to the energy needs of 5 million Americans. Okin uses an estimate of 33% of an animal's energy needs is derived from animal products; however, this is conservative in that many diets now have more than 33% of their diet in animal protein alone.

Lowering protein levels in feline diets may help to improve the sustainability of both the human and pet food system by decreasing pressure on livestock agriculture and ultimately improving environmental effects. Other ways to improve sustainability include using animal byproducts (organs not eaten by humans), plant (mainly pea) proteins, and insect proteins. In addition, feeding less food to an animal helps reduce the carbon footprint and chances of obesity.

Nutrient chart

Notes

The European Union does not use a unified nutrient requirement. A manufacturer committee called FEDIAF (European Pet Food Industry Federation) makes recommendations for cats and dogs that members follow. Both AAFCO and FEDIAF publish in two formats: one in the amount-per-kilogram form above, another in an amount-per-unit-energy format.

See also
 Cat food brands
 Pet food
 Dog food
 Dental health diets for cats
 Pet store
 Senior cat diet

References

External links

The Cat That Ate Tofu Alternet article on vegan cat food
  –  disputes the claim that dry food is harmful
Get The Facts - What's Really In Pet Food from Animal Protection Institute

Cats as pets
Pet foods